Food 4 Life was an Australian television series on the Seven Network hosted by Cindy Sargon.

References

See also
List of Australian television series

Australian cooking television series
Seven Network original programming